Schoolboy Records is an American record label established in 2007 by Scooter Braun through his Schoolboy Entertainment, part of SB Projects (now a subsidiary of Hybe America), a full-service entertainment and marketing company encompassing a wide range of ventures including Raymond Braun Media Group, SB Consulting, SB Management, and Sheba Publishing. The label has a special business arrangement with Universal Music Group.

Schoolboy Records' success came with the signing of Asher Roth and his single "I Love College" followed by Roth's debut album Asleep in the Bread Aisle. Schoolboy Records also had early success with Justin Bieber's songs "Baby" and "One Time", Carly Rae Jepsen and her No. 1 hit song "Call Me Maybe", which has been certified diamond, as well as CL and her song "The Baddest Female". In September 2012, Braun signed Korean rapper Psy, whose hit "Gangnam Style" topped multiple international charts. In late 2012, Universal Republic Records converted back to Republic Records, making all artists under the roster move to Republic. Schoolboy is now distributed by Republic Records.

Artists
Adapted from label's official website.
 Carly Rae Jepsen (outside Canada)
 Psy
 Push Baby (formerly known as Rixton)
 Sheppard
 Tori Kelly
 CL
 Justin Bieber

Former artists

 Amber Riley
 Who Is Fancy
 Todrick Hall
 Martin Garrix
 DEATHBYROMY

References

External links
Schoolboy Records / Schoolboy Entertainment official website
Scooter Braun official website

American record labels
American subsidiaries of foreign companies
Companies based in Santa Monica, California
Contemporary R&B record labels
Labels distributed by Universal Music Group
Music publishing companies of the United States
Pop record labels
Publishing companies established in 2007
Record labels established in 2007
Schoolboy Records